The 1970 Milwaukee Brewers season was the second season for the franchise.  The team finished fourth in the American League West with a record of 65 wins and 97 losses, 33 games behind the Minnesota Twins. This was the team's inaugural season in Milwaukee, Wisconsin, after spending its first year of existence in Seattle, Washington as the Pilots.

Offseason

Relocation to Milwaukee 
During the offseason, Dewey Soriano, president of the financially strapped Seattle Pilots, crossed paths with Bud Selig, a Milwaukee car dealer who had been working to bring baseball back to Milwaukee since the Braves (of which he'd been a minority owner) left for Atlanta after the 1965 season. They met in secret for over a month after the end of the season, and during Game 1 of the World Series, Soriano agreed to sell the Pilots to Selig for $10 to $13 million (depending on the source). Selig would then move the team to Milwaukee and rename it the Brewers. However, the owners turned it down in the face of pressure from Washington's two senators, Warren Magnuson and Henry (Scoop) Jackson, as well as state attorney general Slade Gorton.  MLB asked Soriano and chairman William Daley to find a local buyer.

Local theater chain owner Fred Danz came forward in October 1969 with a $10 million deal, but it fizzled when the Bank of California called in a $4 million loan it had made to Soriano and Daley for startup costs. In January 1970, Westin Hotels owner Eddie Carlson put together a nonprofit group to buy the team. However, the owners rejected the idea almost out of hand since it would have devalued the other clubs' worth. A more traditional deal came one vote short of approval.

After a winter and spring full of court action, the Pilots reported for spring training under new manager Dave Bristol unsure of where they would play. The owners had given tentative approval to the Milwaukee group, but the state of Washington got an injunction on March 17 to stop the deal. Soriano immediately filed for bankruptcy — a move intended to forestall any post-sale legal action. At the bankruptcy hearing a week later, general manager Marvin Milkes testified there was not enough money to pay the coaches, players and office staff. Had Milkes been more than 10 days late in paying the players, they would have all become free agents and left Seattle without a team for the 1970 season. With this in mind, Federal Bankruptcy Referee Sidney C. Volinn declared the Pilots bankrupt on March 31 — seven days before Opening Day — clearing the way for them to move to Milwaukee. The team's equipment had been sitting in Provo, Utah, with the drivers awaiting word on whether to drive toward Seattle or Milwaukee.  MLB returned to Seattle in 1977, when the Mariners began play at the Kingdome.

Coincidentally, Milwaukee had gained its previous team under circumstances similar to some of those surrounding this move. The Braves had moved from Boston to Milwaukee only a few weeks before the 1953 season.

Notable transactions 
 November 21, 1969: Mike Marshall was purchased from the Seattle Pilots by the Houston Astros.
 December 7, 1969: Diego Seguí and Ray Oyler were traded by the Seattle Pilots to the Oakland Athletics for George Lauzerique and Ted Kubiak.
 January 15, 1970: Don Mincher and Ron Clark were traded by the Seattle Pilots to the Oakland Athletics for Phil Roof, Mike Hershberger, Lew Krausse Jr., and Ken Sanders.

Regular season

Opening Day starters 
Max Alvis
Tommy Harper
Mike Hegan
Steve Hovley
Lew Krausse Jr.
Ted Kubiak
Jerry McNertney
Russ Snyder
Danny Walton

Season standings

Record vs. opponents

Notable transactions 
 April 1, 1970: Steve Barber was released by the Brewers.
 May 11, 1970: Wayne Comer was traded by the Brewers to the Washington Senators for Hank Allen and Ron Theobald.
 May 18, 1970: John Donaldson was traded by the Brewers to the Oakland Athletics for Roberto Peña.
 June 4, 1970: John Tamargo was drafted by the Brewers in the 4th round of the secondary phase of the 1970 Major League Baseball draft, but did not sign.
 June 11, 1970: Steve Hovley was traded by the Brewers to the Oakland Athletics for Al Downing and Tito Francona.
 June 15, 1970: John O'Donoghue was traded by the Brewers to the Montreal Expos for José Herrera.
 August 20, 1970: Floyd Wicker was purchased by the Brewers from the Montreal Expos.

Roster

Player stats

Batting

Starters by position 
Note: Pos = Position; G = Games played; AB = At bats; H = Hits; Avg. = Batting average; HR = Home runs; RBI = Runs batted in

Other batters 
Note: G = Games played; AB = At bats; H = Hits; Avg. = Batting average; HR = Home runs; RBI = Runs batted in

Pitching

Starting pitchers 
Note: G = Games pitched; IP = Innings pitched; W = Wins; L = Losses; ERA = Earned run average; SO = Strikeouts

Other pitchers 
Note: G = Games pitched; IP = Innings pitched; W = Wins; L = Losses; ERA = Earned run average; SO = Strikeouts

Relief pitchers 
Note: G = Games pitched; W = Wins; L = Losses; SV = Saves; ERA = Earned run average; SO = Strikeouts

Farm system

The Brewers' farm system consisted of four minor league affiliates in 1970. The Double-A Jacksonville Suns were shared with the Montreal Expos.

Notes

References 
1970 Milwaukee Brewers at Baseball Reference
1970 Milwaukee Brewers at Baseball Almanac

Milwaukee Brewers seasons
Milwaukee Brewers season
Inaugural Major League Baseball seasons by team
Milwaukee Brewers